The 1912 AAA Championship Car season consisted of 18 races, beginning in Santa Monica, California on May 4 and concluding in Brooklyn, New York on November 5. There was also one non-championship event at Milwaukee, Wisconsin.  The de facto National Champion as poled by the American automobile journal Motor Age was Ralph DePalma and the winner of the Indianapolis 500 was Joe Dawson. Points were not awarded by the AAA Contest Board during the 1912 season. Champions of the day were decided by Chris G. Sinsabaugh, an editor at Motor Age, based on merit and on track performance. The points table was created retroactively in 1927 – all championship results should be considered unofficial.

Schedule and results

* Events on same date were run simultaneously.

Leading National Championship standings

The points paying system for the 1909–1915 and 1917–1919 season were retroactively applied in 1927 and revised in 1951 using the points system from 1920.

References

General references
http://www.champcarstats.com/year/1912.htm accessed 8/21/15
http://www.teamdan.com/archive/gen/indycar/1912.html accessed 8/21/15

AAA Championship Car season
AAA Championship Car
AAA Championship Car